John Joseph "The Bangladesh Hammer" Hannahan IV (born March 4, 1980) is an American former professional baseball utility player. He played in Major League Baseball (MLB) for the Detroit Tigers, Oakland Athletics, Seattle Mariners, Cleveland Indians and Cincinnati Reds.

Amateur  career
Hannahan attended Cretin-Derham Hall High School in Saint Paul, Minnesota, and also played football as a defensive back and earned All-Conference honors in basketball. He attended the University of Minnesota, where he played college baseball for the Minnesota Golden Gophers. He was named All-American.

In  he batted .327 with 46 runs, 18 doubles, four triples, eight home runs, 43 RBIs and nine stolen bases during his sophomore season.  He was named Big Ten Player of the Year and First-Team All-Big Ten during his junior season after hitting .372 with 65 runs, 20 doubles, four triples, 15 home runs, 63 RBIs and 16 stolen bases. He led the Big Ten Conference in runs, home runs and RBIs. Hannahan played for the Mankato Mashers of the Northwoods League, a collegiate summer league.

Professional career

Detroit Tigers
The Detroit Tigers selected Hannahan in the third round of the 2001 Major League Baseball draft. Hannahan made his major league debut on May 26, playing first base. He went 0-for-9 with the Tigers in 2006.

Oakland Athletics
On August 13, he was traded to the Oakland Athletics for outfielder Jason Perry. He had been with the Toledo Mud Hens, the Tigers' Triple-A team, for the whole season until the trade. He hit .295 with 13 home runs and led the International League with a .422 on-base percentage at the time of the trade. The Athletics purchased his contract the day after Eric Chavez went on the disabled list. He started 40 of the Athletics' final 43 games at third base.

On August 15, Hannahan got his first major league hit, a double, off Mark Buehrle of the Chicago White Sox. It was the fourteenth at bat of his career. On August 20, 2007, against the Toronto Blue Jays, Hannahan hit his first career home run off Shaun Marcum.
In , Hannahan was on the major league roster the entire season, serving as the primary third baseman while Eric Chavez was on the disabled list most of the year. Following the 2009 spring training camp, he was sent to the Sacramento River Cats.

Seattle Mariners

2009 season
Hannahan was traded to the Seattle Mariners for pitcher Justin Souza on July 11, .

With the Mariners holding an 11–5 lead over the Kansas City Royals on August 6, Seattle manager Don Wakamatsu substituted Hannahan for shortstop Jack Wilson, who was experiencing minor discomfort in his right triceps area. This marked the first time Hannahan played shortstop at the major league level.

He was briefly the starting third baseman for the Mariners after Adrián Beltré was put on the disabled list. Hannahan finished the season with a combined .213 batting average between the A's and the Mariners with 14 doubles, two triples, four home runs and 19 RBIs in 103 games.

On May 28, 2010, he was designated for assignment by Seattle. He accepted his option to Triple-A Tacoma.

Boston Red Sox
On July 22, 2010, Hannahan was traded to the Boston Red Sox for cash considerations or a player to be named later. He was assigned to Triple-A Pawtucket.

Cleveland Indians
On December 3, 2010, Hannahan signed a minor league contract with the Cleveland Indians with an invitation to major league spring training. He earned a spot with the Indians after spring training.

Cincinnati Reds
On December 13, 2012, Hannahan signed a two-year, $4 million contract with a club option for 2015 with the Cincinnati Reds and was expected to provide depth throughout the infield, specifically at third base. Initially reported as a one-year deal, he earned $1 million in each of his guaranteed seasons, and his option was worth $4 million with a $2 million buyout.

LG Twins
On December 23, 2014, Hannahan signed a one-year deal worth $1 million with the LG Twins of the Korea Baseball Organization. On July 16, 2015, he was released from the LG Twins due to injuries and Luis Jiménez was signed to replace him. On July 18, 2015, Hannahan held a press conference to announce his retirement from professional baseball.

References

External links

1980 births
Living people
Detroit Tigers players
Oakland Athletics players
Seattle Mariners players
Cleveland Indians players
Cincinnati Reds players
Baseball players from Saint Paul, Minnesota
Major League Baseball third basemen
Minnesota Golden Gophers baseball players
Oneonta Tigers players
West Michigan Whitecaps players
Lakeland Tigers players
Erie SeaWolves players
Toledo Mud Hens players
Sacramento River Cats players
Tacoma Rainiers players
Pawtucket Red Sox players
Lake County Captains players
Columbus Clippers players
Dayton Dragons players
Louisville Bats players
LG Twins players
American expatriate baseball players in South Korea